IPRC may refer to:

 Independent Publishing Resource Center
 The International Pacific Research Center at the University of Hawaii
 The proposed Indo Pacific Rugby Championship rugby union competition